Albadea is a genus of moths belonging to the subfamily Tortricinae of the family Tortricidae.

Species
Albadea dea Razowski & Becker, 2002

See also
List of Tortricidae genera

References

 , 2005: World catalogue of insects volume 5 Tortricidae.
 , 2002: Black and white forewing pattern in Tortricidae (Lepidoptera), with descriptions of new taxa of Neotropical Euliini. Acta Zoologica Cracoviensia 45(3): 245-257. Full article:  .

External links

tortricidae.com

Euliini
Tortricidae genera